The FIBA Under-17 Women's Basketball World Cup (formerly FIBA Under-17 World Championship for Women) is the women's international under-17 basketball championship organised by FIBA. The event started in July 2010, and is held biennially.

Summaries

Medal table

Participation details

Tournament awards

Most recent award winners (2022)

Debut of national teams

Ranking of teams by number of appearances 

Bold indicates team who qualified for the 2024 edition.

Overall win–loss record 2010–2022
*Data updated to the 2022 edition

See also
FIBA Under-19 Women's Basketball World Cup
FIBA Under-17 Basketball World Cup
FIBA Under-19 Basketball World Cup

References

External links
FIBA official website

 
Under
Under-17 basketball competitions between national teams
Women's basketball competitions between national teams
World youth sports competitions
Recurring sporting events established in 2010
World championships in basketball